The Rise and Fall of Wellington Boots is an Australian television sitcom which first screened on the ABC in 1975.

Cast
 Serge Lazareff
 Julieanne Newbould
 Gordon Glenwright
 Tony Bonner
 Anne Phelan
 Colin McEwan
 Syd Conabere
 Rosie Sturgess
 Natalie Mosco

See also
 List of Australian television series

References

External links
 
 The Rise and Fall of Wellington Boots at Classic Television Australia

1975 Australian television series debuts
1975 Australian television series endings
Australian television sitcoms
Australian Broadcasting Corporation original programming
English-language television shows